
Year 85 BC was a year of the pre-Julian Roman calendar. At the time it was known as the Year of the Consulship of Cinna and Carbo (or, less frequently, year 669 Ab urbe condita). The denomination 85 BC for this year has been used since the early medieval period, when the Anno Domini calendar era became the prevalent method in Europe for naming years.

Events 
 By place 

 Roman Republic 
 First Mithridatic War: Lucius Cornelius Sulla again defeats Archelaus in the decisive Battle of Orchomenus.

Births 
 Atia, niece of Julius Caesar and mother of Augustus (d. 43 BC)
 Marcus Junius Brutus, conspirator and assassin in the murder of Julius Caesar (approximate date)
 Tiberius Claudius Nero, Roman politician and father of Tiberius (d. 33 BC)

Deaths 
 Gaius Julius Caesar, Roman politician (b. c. 140 BC)
Mnesarchus of Athens, Stoic philosopher (b. c. 160 BC)

References